The  Malta lunar sample displays are two commemorative plaques consisting of small fragments of Moon specimen brought back with the Apollo 11 and Apollo 17 lunar missions and were given to the people of Malta by United States President Richard Nixon as goodwill gifts.

Description

Apollo 11

Apollo 17

History
 
The Maltese Apollo 17 display was stolen from the at the Museum of Natural History in Mdina in 2004. The Maltese flag that had flown on the Apollo 17 mission was left behind. As of 2012, the Apollo 17 Maltese "goodwill Moon rock" is still missing.

The Maltese Apollo 11 display given to Malta is housed in the Gozo Museum of Natural Science in Gozo, Malta.

See also
 List of Apollo lunar sample displays

References

Further reading

External links
 Partial list of Apollo  11, 12, 14, 15, 16, and 17 sample locations, NASA Johnson Space Center

Stolen and missing moon rocks
Malta–United States relations
Tourist attractions in Malta
Mdina
2004 in Malta
2004 crimes in Europe
Crime in Malta